Juan David Castañeda Muñoz (born 26 January 1995) is a Colombian professional footballer who plays as a striker for I-League club Sreenidi Deccan. Besides Colombia, he has played in Iraq and India.

Club career

Sreenidi Deccan
On 20 September 2021, Castañeda joined Indian club Sreenidi Deccan, one of the new I-League entrants.

He debuted for the club, on 26 November 2021 in the 2021 IFA Shield opener against Southern Samity. He scored a brace in the match which ended in a 4–1 win. He made his I-League debut, on 27 December 2021 against NEROCA, in their 3–2 defeat in which he scored a goal. He then scored a brace against TRAU on 3 March 2022. He again scored a goal against Mohammedan in their 3–1 defeat. After finishing fourth in group stage with six wins in twelve matches, they moved to the championship stage. At the end, the club finished their maiden league campaign in third place with 32 points in 18 matches, and won the last match against Churchill Brothers on 14 May.

He was retained by the club in 2022–23 season. He maintained his goal scoring moment in that season, and finished as second highest scorer behind Luka Majcen.

Career statistics

Honours 
Atlético Nacional
 Superliga Colombiana: 2016
Sreenidi Deccan
 I-League: runner-up 2022–23; third place 2021–22
 IFA Shield runner-up: 2021

References

External links 
 

1995 births
Living people
Colombian footballers
Colombian expatriate footballers
Atlético Nacional footballers
Leones F.C. footballers
Cortuluá footballers
Fortaleza C.E.I.F. footballers
Patriotas Boyacá footballers
Zakho FC players
Categoría Primera A players
Categoría Primera B players
Association football forwards
Footballers from Medellín
Expatriate footballers in Iraq
Expatriate footballers in India
Sreenidi Deccan FC players